Alkoomi Wines (often referred to simply as Alkoomi) is an Australian winery based at Frankland River, in the Great Southern wine region of Western Australia.  It was founded in 1971 by Merv and Judy Lange, who have been described by Ray Jordan, wine writer for The West Australian, as "two of the great pioneers of the WA wine industry".

The Alkoomi range is extensively available at bottle shops across Western Australia, with especially strong sales figures in the Applecross and Mount Pleasant suburbs of Perth.

The winery's name is an Aboriginal word meaning "watering place", although the winery's website says it means "a place we chose".

See also

 Australian wine
 List of wineries in Western Australia
 Western Australian wine

References

Notes

Bibliography

External links
 – official site

Food and drink companies established in 1971
Great Southern (Western Australia)
Wineries in Western Australia
1971 establishments in Australia